Baneswarpur is a village within the jurisdiction of the Usthi police station in the Magrahat I CD block in the Diamond Harbour subdivision of the South 24 Parganas district in the Indian state of West Bengal.

Geography

Area overview
Diamond Harbour subdivision is a rural subdivision with patches of urbanization. Only 14.61% of the population lives in urban areas and an overwhelming 85.39% lives in the rural areas. In the eastern portion of the subdivision (shown in the map alongside) there are 24 census towns. The entire district is situated in the Ganges Delta and the eastern part of the district is a flat plain area with small towns, many in clusters. Location of places in the larger map varies a little. It is an OpenStreetMap, while we are using coordinates as in Google Maps.

Note: The map alongside presents some of the notable locations in the subdivision. All places marked in the map are linked in the larger full screen map.

Location

Demographics
According to the 2011 Census of India, Baneswarpur had a total population of 1,960, of which 1,028 (52%) were males and 932 (48%) were females. There were 257 persons in the age range of 0–6 years. The total number of literate persons in Baneswarpur was 1,375  (80.74% of the population over 6 years).

Transport
Baneswarpur is on the Sangrampur-Samashat Road.

Healthcare
Baneswarpur Rural Hospital, with 30 beds, is the major government medical facility in the Magrahat I CD block.

References

Villages in South 24 Parganas district